Sing Hallelujah may refer to:

Music
Sing Hallelujah, production at The Village Gate

Albums
Sing Hallelujah, by Lonnie Donegan, 1962

Songs
"Sing Hallelujah", by The First Edition (band)
"Sing Hallelujah" (Mike Settle song), 1964 
"Sing Hallelujah" (Dr. Alban song), 1993
"Sing Hallelujah", by Esther Ofarim, 1966
"Sing Hallelujah", by Les Humphries, 1972
"Sing Hallelujah", by The New Seekers Macaulay, 1974
"Sing Hallelujah", by Steve McPherson from sung by Hillsong
"Sing Hallelujah", by Steven Curtis Chapman from Re:creation
"Sing Hallelujah", by German Bonds, 1966  
"Sing Noel, Sing Hallelujah", by Michael W. Smith from It's a Wonderful Christmas
"Sing Hallelujah", by Chris and Conrad from Chris and Conrad (album)
"Sing Hallelujah", by Mark Stoke from Sea to Sea: Filled with Your Glory
"Sing Hallelujah", by Oscar Brand from Sing-Along Bawdy Songs & Backroom Ballads, 1956
"Sing Hallelujah to the Lord", by Linda Stassen, 1974